NGC 4151 is an intermediate spiral Seyfert galaxy with weak inner ring structure located  from Earth in the constellation Canes Venatici.  The galaxy was first mentioned by William Herschel on March 17, 1787; it was one of the six Seyfert galaxies described in the paper  which defined the term. It is one of the nearest galaxies to Earth to contain an actively growing supermassive black hole. The black hole would have a mass on the order of 2.5 million to 30 million solar masses. It was speculated that the nucleus may host a binary black hole, with about 40 million and about 10 million solar masses respectively, orbiting with a 15.8-year period. This is, however, still a matter of active debate.

Some astronomers nickname it the "Eye of Sauron" from its appearance.

One supernova has been observed in NGC 4151:  SN 2018aoq (Type II, mag 14.4).

X-ray source

X-ray emission from NGC 4151 was apparently first detected on December 24, 1970, with the X-ray observatory satellite Uhuru, although the observation  spanned an error-box of 0.56 square degrees and there is some controversy as to whether UHURU might not have detected the BL Lac object 1E 1207.9 +3945, which is inside their error box - the later HEAO 1 detected an X-ray source of NGC 4151 at 1H 1210+393, coincident with the optical position of the nucleus and outside the error box of Uhuru.

To explain the X-ray emission two different possibilities have been proposed:

 radiation of material falling onto the central black hole (which was growing much more quickly about 25,000 years ago) was so bright that it stripped electrons away from the atoms in the gas in its path, and then electrons recombined with these ionized atoms
 the energy released by material flowing into the black hole in an accretion disk created a vigorous outflow of gas from the surface of the disk, which directly heated gas in its path to X-ray emitting temperatures

See also
 X-ray astronomy

References

External links

 Hubble site news center: Fireworks Near a Black Hole in the Core of Seyfert Galaxy NGC 4151

Galaxies discovered in 1787
Intermediate spiral galaxies
Seyfert galaxies
Canes Venatici
4151
07166
38739
X-ray astronomy
Astronomical X-ray sources
Articles containing video clips
17870317